The 2013–14 season was Everton's 22nd season in the Premier League and 60th consecutive season in the top division of English football. It was also Everton's 115th season of league football and 117th season in all competitions. It was the first season without David Moyes as manager since 2002, with Moyes leaving Everton to succeed Alex Ferguson as manager of Manchester United. In addition, the club crest was redesigned ahead of this season for the first time since 2000. On 5 June 2013, Roberto Martínez was announced as the new Everton manager, having left his post at relegated FA Cup holders Wigan Athletic. Everton finished in sixth position in the domestic league in the previous season, missing out on qualification for the UEFA Europa League, meaning it failed to qualify for any European competitions for the fourth season running.

Everton's Premier League campaign began in August 2013 with Martínez changing their style of play to a possession based, attractive brand of football which initially led to three successive draws to start the season. A first victory came in the next match 1–0 against Chelsea and by Christmas Everton had only suffered one defeat, a run which included a win over Moyes' Manchester United, the first time the club had tasted success at Old Trafford in 21 years. The team almost went an entire year unbeaten at home but lost 1–0 against Sunderland on Boxing Day. Everton's progress stalled somewhat in the early part of 2014 with three losses in four games against Liverpool, Tottenham Hotspur and Chelsea, before winning seven league games in a row for the first time since 1987. The spell contained perhaps Everton's best performance of the season when they defeated Arsenal 3–0. The streak was ended with a 3–2 home defeat by Crystal Palace, but Everton returned to do the double over Manchester United for the first time since 1969. Moyes was sacked as their manager a day later. Two defeats in a row after this ended Everton's Champions League hopes but a finish of 5th in the league table is their highest in five years with Everton qualifying for next season's Europa League. Martínez utilised the loan market during the season, with Romelu Lukaku (on loan from Chelsea) being Everton's top scorer with 16 goals in all competitions. The emergence of young players such as Ross Barkley, John Stones and summer signing James McCarthy was also a feature of his debut season in charge, with Barkley going on to be selected for England's World Cup squad. Right back Séamus Coleman was named Everton's player of the year.

In the cup competitions Everton lost in the sixth round of the FA Cup (entered at round three) and the third round of the League Cup (entered at round two).

Season overview

July
Everton announced on 25 May 2013 that the club would be competing in the inaugural edition of the International Champions Cup, based in venues across the United States and in one European city, and held between 27 July and 7 August 2013. The opening fixtures were announced four days later, with Everton playing 2012–13 Serie A champions Juventus in the first round.

Between 8 and 9 July 2013, Roberto Martínez signed four players who last season played for his former club Wigan Athletic: 
 Arouna Koné, a 29-year-old Ivorian striker who scored 11 goals in his debut Premier League campaign in the previous season. Everton met a £5 million release clause and beat off the competition of Newcastle United to sign him.
 Antolín Alcaraz, a 30-year-old Paraguayan central defender who joined on a free transfer after his contract at Wigan had expired. He had been at Wigan for three seasons but saw his 2012–13 season curtailed due to a groin injury.
 Joel Robles, a 23-year-old Spanish goalkeeper who had spent last year on loan to Wigan from Atlético Madrid. He joined on a five-year contract for an undisclosed fee.
 James McCarthy, signed from Wigan for £13 million. He became the club's second most expensive player in their history; due to a clause in his Wigan contract, his former club Hamilton received a sell-on fee from the Everton transfer, which they used to invest in the youth system through which the player had emerged. He forged a partnership with Gareth Barry which was a key factor in Everton amassing 72 points during the campaign, a club record in the Premier League. Martínez claimed that McCarthy's performances had been so impressive that his transfer value had doubled during his first season. McCarthy had to wait until the last game of the season to score his first goal for the club when he netted the opener in a 2–0 win over Hull City.
Everton also signed 19-year-old Spanish forward Gerard Deulofeu on a season-long loan from Barcelona the following day, on 10 July 2013.

August
Everton's Premier League campaign began on 17 August with a 2–2 draw away to Norwich City, during which Ross Barkley scored his first goal for the club. New manager Roberto Martínez saw his first competitive win come in the second round of the League Cup with Everton needing extra time to defeat League One Stevenage 2–1.

September
On the final day of the summer transfer window Everton brought three players into the club:
James McCarthy, a 22-year-old central midfielder who had previously been at Wigan for four years. Everton paid £13 million for the player.
Romelu Lukaku on a season-long loan from Chelsea. He had been on loan at West Bromwich Albion last season, scoring 17 goals in 35 league games.
Gareth Barry, a 32-year-old defensive midfielder also on a season-long loan from Manchester City. He had made 53 appearances for England.

Two long standing Everton players were sold:

Marouane Fellaini left for Manchester United in a £27.5 million deal.
Victor Anichebe was transferred to West Bromwich Albion in a deal which could rise to £6 million. The striker had made 168 appearances for the club, scoring 26 goals.

Everton's first league win of the season came with a 1–0 home success over Chelsea with Steven Naismith getting the game's only goal. They then came back from 2–1 down to beat West Ham United 3–2 at Upton Park as Leighton Baines scored two free-kicks and Romelu Lukaku became the first Everton player since Alan Ball in 1966 to score a winner on their debut. The result also made Roberto Martínez the first ever manager in the club's history to be unbeaten in their first six games. However, the run did not last as in the next fixture Fulham won 2–1 in the third round of the League Cup. New striker Lukaku continued his early form for the club by scoring two goals in the next league game against Newcastle United in a match where Everton led 3–0 at half-time and survived a second half comeback to win 3–2.

October
Everton's unbeaten run in the Premier League at the start of the season came to an end on 5 October when it was defeated by Manchester City by 3–1 at the City of Manchester Stadium. After the international break the following week, Everton returned to winning ways with a 2–1 home victory over Hull City, which saw Steven Pienaar score the winning goal just 10 seconds after coming off the bench, making his return to the side from a hamstring injury. A 2–0 away win over Aston Villa the following week saw Romelu Lukaku score his fifth goal in as many league appearances for Everton, and momentarily moved the club into fourth position on the league table.

November
Everton began the month with a 0–0 home draw against Tottenham Hotspur which meant the club had only suffered one defeat from their opening 10 games in successive seasons for the first time in its history. Another 0–0 draw followed before the first Merseyside derby of the season during which Everton came from 2–1 down to lead 3–2, before an 89th minute Liverpool goal saw the game end 3–3. Everton returned to winning ways by defeating Stoke City 4–0 with both Gerard Deulofeu and Bryan Oviedo scoring their first league goals for the club. Romelu Lukaku continued his impressive start to the season by scoring his eighth goal in ten games as Everton finished the month in the Champions League places.

December
The next fixture saw Manchester United manager David Moyes face his former club for the first time and it was Everton who won 1–0 to record their first victory at Old Trafford for the first time in 21 years with another goal from Oviedo. Deulofeu scored an 84th-minute goal to earn a 1–1 draw with league leaders Arsenal at the Emirates Stadium in the next fixture. Everton then beat Fulham at home for the 21st consecutive time with a 4–1 win as Leon Osman scored on his 300th league appearance for the club. Everton then travelled to Swansea and won 2–1, maintaining their record of never having lost to the Welsh side in any fixture. The club then suffered a setback to bottom of the table Sunderland, losing at home in the league for the first time in a year, after Tim Howard conceded an early penalty and was sent off in the 25th minute. Winning ways were restored in the following fixture against Southampton with goals from Coleman and Lukaku, his first in five league starts, to ensure Everton ended 2013 fourth in the table.

January
The new year began with Everton travelling to the Britannia Stadium to face Stoke City and they earned a 1–1 draw courtesy of a stoppage time Leighton Baines penalty. A comfortable progression into the fourth round of the FA Cup followed by beating Championship side Queens Park Rangers 4–0 with striker Nikica Jelavić scoring his first goals of the season. Everton's first league win of 2014 was a 2–0 home success over Norwich City, meaning the side had now earned 42 points from their last 51 at Goodison Park. The club then saw off League One side Stevenage 4–0 to reach the fifth round of the FA Cup, but then suffered their biggest derby defeat since 1982 as Liverpool thrashed them 4–0 at Anfield.

During the January transfer window Everton brought two players into their first team squad:
 Aiden McGeady, an Irish international winger from Russian side Spartak Moscow for an undisclosed fee.
 Lacina Traoré, a six-foot eight Ivorian centre forward on loan for the rest of the season from Monaco.

The club also sold two players during the month:
 Nikica Jelavić's two-year stay at the club ended after he moved to Hull City. The striker had enjoyed a fast start for Everton by scoring nine goals in his first thirteen games, but netted just two goals in the whole of 2013. He had fallen behind Romelu Lukaku as the first choice striker and also moved in a bid to improve his chances of selection in Croatia's squad for the World Cup.
 John Heitinga moved to Fulham after four and a half years at Everton. He had struggled for first team football during the season having failed to start a single league game, but did score on his final appearance for the club in an FA Cup fixture against Stevenage.

February
Kevin Mirallas scored a fantastic 25 yard freekick as Everton came from a goal down to beat Aston Villa 2–1. Everton lost for the second time in three games as Tottenham Hotspur defeated them 1–0 at White Hart Lane, but their form in the FA Cup continued with a 3–1 home success over Swansea City to reach the quarter-finals. The club then lost a second league game in a row for the first time this season when Chelsea scored a stoppage time winner at Stamford Bridge.

March
Romelu Lukaku returned from an ankle injury to score a late goal in a 1–0 win over West Ham United to begin March, but Everton were knocked out of the FA Cup following a 4–1 defeat to Arsenal which means the club have now failed to beat the Gunners in the last 20 away meetings. Séamus Coleman's miscued shot in the last minute of the next game against Cardiff City ensured Everton responded with a 2–1 victory to be placed sixth in the table. The club then won four league games in a row for the first time in six years by defeating Newcastle United 3–0 thanks to an amazing solo goal from Ross Barkley who dribbled from inside his own half to score the opener. It was Everton's biggest win at Newcastle in 47 years. Everton ended the month with a fifth successive victory for the first time since 2002 with a 3–1 away win over Fulham.

April and May
Everton beat Champions League rivals Arsenal 3–0 at home in a performance manager Martínez described as tactically perfect. The result left the side a point behind the fourth placed Gunners with a game in hand. A seventh successive league win for the first time since 1987 followed with a 1–0 victory over Sunderland which moved the club into fourth place. It also took them to 65 points, the highest total Everton have ever amassed in a Premier League season. The club then handed the initiative back to Arsenal in the race for Champions League football as they lost 3–2 at home to Crystal Palace. Everton responded with a 2–0 victory over Manchester United and in doing so did the double over for the reigning champions for the first time since 1969. Everton's previous manager David Moyes was sacked by United a day later after just 10 months in charge. However, Everton then lost 2–0 against Southampton (with own goals from Antolín Alcaraz and Séamus Coleman) and 3–2 to Manchester City to end their chances of finishing the campaign in fourth place. Before the Manchester City game there had been rumours that Everton would not try 100% or field a weakened side as any positive result would give rivals Liverpool the impetus in the race for the title. Roberto Martínez insisted his team would be giving everything they had for the win and, despite the loss, he said afterwards that he was proud of the effort of the players. Everton finished the season by winning 2–0 away at FA Cup finalists Hull City to finish fifth in the table and qualify for next season's Europa League.

Pre-season

Friendlies

International Champions Cup

Competitions

Overall

Premier League

League table

Results summary

Results by matchday

Matches

League Cup

FA Cup

Players

First team squad

Out on loan

Player awards 
 Player of the Season – Séamus Coleman
 Players' Player of the Season – Séamus Coleman
 Young Player of the Season – Ross Barkley
 Reserve / U21 Player of the Season – Tyias Browning
 Academy Player of the Season – Ryan Ledson
 Goal of the Season – Ross Barkley vs. Manchester City

Statistics

Appearances

|-
|colspan="14"|Players who made appearances but left the club during the season:

|}

Goalscorers

{| class="wikitable sortable" style="text-align:center"
! width=15px | 
! width=120px | Name
! width=50px | PremierLeague
! width=50px | FA Cup
! width=50px | LeagueCup
! width=50px | Total
|-
| rowspan=1|1 || align=left| || 15 || 1 || 0 || 16
|-
| rowspan=1|2 || align=left| || 5 || 3 || 1 || 9
|-
| rowspan=1|3 || align=left| || 8 || 0 || 0 || 8
|-
| rowspan=2|4 || align=left| || 6 || 1 || 0 || 7
|-
| align=left| || 6 || 1 || 0 || 7
|-
| rowspan=1|6 || align=left| || 5 || 1 || 0 || 6
|-
| rowspan=1|7 ||align=left| || 3 || 0 || 1 || 4
|-
| rowspan=2|8 || align=left| || 3 || 0 || 0 || 3
|-
|align=left| || 3 || 0 || 0 || 3
|-
| rowspan=2|10 || align=left| || 0 || 2 || 0 || 2
|-
|align=left| || 2 || 0 || 0 || 2
|-
| rowspan=6|12 || align=left| || 0 || 0 || 1 || 1
|-
|align=left| || 0 || 1 || 0 || 1
|-
|align=left| || 0 || 1 || 0 || 1
|-
|align=left| || 1 || 0 || 0 || 1
|-
|align=left| || 1 || 0 || 0 || 1
|-
|align=left| || 0 || 1 || 0 || 1
|-
|colspan="2"|Own Goals || 3 || 0 || 0 || 3
|- class="unsortable"
!colspan="2"|Total || 61 || 12 || 3 || 76
|-

Disciplinary record
{| class="wikitable" style="text-align: center; width: 50%"
|-
! rowspan="2" width=15px |
! rowspan="2" width=120px |Name
! colspan="3" width=50px |Premier League
! colspan="3" width=50px |FA Cup
! colspan="3" width=50px |League Cup
! colspan="3" width=50px |Total
|-
!  style="width:25px; background:#fe9;"|
!  style="width:28px; background:#ff8888;"|
!  style="width:25px; background:#ff8888;"|
!  style="width:25px; background:#fe9;"|
!  style="width:28px; background:#ff8888;"|
!  style="width:25px; background:#ff8888;"|
!  style="width:25px; background:#fe9;"|
!  style="width:28px; background:#ff8888;"|
!  style="width:25px; background:#ff8888;"|
!  style="width:25px; background:#fe9;"|
!  style="width:28px; background:#ff8888;"|
!  style="width:25px; background:#ff8888;"|
|-
| 1
|align=left|Gareth Barry
|10
|0
|0
|0
|0
|0
|0
|0
|0
|10
|0
|0
|-
|2
|align=left|Tim Howard
|4
|0
|1
|0
|0
|0
|0
|0
|0
|4
|0
|1
|-
|rowspan="2"|3
|align=left|Leighton Baines
|6
|0
|0
|0
|0
|0
|0
|0
|0
|6
|0
|0
|-
|align=left|James McCarthy
|4
|0
|0
|1
|0
|0
|1
|0
|0
|6
|0
|0
|-
|rowspan="2"|5
|align=left|Ross Barkley
|5
|0
|0
|0
|0
|0
|0
|0
|0
|5
|0
|0
|-
|align=left|Kevin Mirallas
|5
|0
|0
|0
|0
|0
|0
|0
|0
|5
|0
|0
|-
|rowspan="2"|7
|align=left|Séamus Coleman
|3
|0
|0
|0
|0
|0
|1
|0
|0
|4
|0
|0
|-
|align=left|Leon Osman
|4
|0
|0
|0
|0
|0
|0
|0
|0
|4
|0
|0
|-
|rowspan="6"|9
|align=left|Sylvain Distin
|2
|0
|0
|0
|0
|0
|0
|0
|0
|2
|0
|0
|-
|align=left|Phil Jagielka
|2
|0
|0
|0
|0
|0
|0
|0
|0
|2
|0
|0
|-
|align=left|Steven Naismith
|1
|0
|0
|1
|0
|0
|0
|0
|0
|2
|0
|0
|-
|align=left|Bryan Oviedo
|1
|0
|0
|0
|0
|0
|1
|0
|0
|2
|0
|0
|-
|align=left|Steven Pienaar
|2
|0
|0
|0
|0
|0
|0
|0
|0
|2
|0
|0
|-
|align=left|John Stones
|1
|0
|0
|0
|0
|0
|1
|0
|0
|2
|0
|0
|-
|rowspan="3"|15
|align=left|Gerard Deulofeu
|1
|0
|0
|0
|0
|0
|0
|0
|0
|1
|0
|0
|-
|align=left|Darron Gibson
|1
|0
|0
|0
|0
|0
|0
|0
|0
|1
|0
|0
|-
|align=left|Romelu Lukaku
|1
|0
|0
|0
|0
|0
|0
|0
|0
|1
|0
|0
|-
!colspan=2|Total
! 48 !! 0 !! 1 !! 2 !! 0 !! 0 !! 5 !! 0 !! 0 !! 55 !! 0 !! 1

Home attendances

Correct as of match played 3 May 2014.

{| class="wikitable sortable" style="text-align:center; font-size:90%"
|-
!width=100 | Comp
!width=120 | Date
!width=60 | Score
!width=250 class="unsortable" | Opponent
!width=150 | Attendance
|-
|Premier League||24 August 2013 ||bgcolor="#FFFFCC"|0–0 ||West Bromwich Albion ||36,410
|-
|League Cup||28 August 2013 ||bgcolor="#CCFFCC"|2–1 ||Stevenage ||22,730
|-
|Premier League||14 September 2013 ||bgcolor="#CCFFCC"|1–0 ||Chelsea ||36,034
|-
|Premier League||30 September 2013 ||bgcolor="#CCFFCC"|3–2 ||Newcastle ||33,495
|-
|Premier League||19 October 2013 ||bgcolor="#CCFFCC"|2–1 ||Hull City ||38,828
|-
|Premier League||3 November 2013 ||bgcolor="#FFFFCC"|0–0 ||Tottenham Hotspur ||38,378
|-
|Premier League||23 November 2013 ||bgcolor="#FFFFCC"|3–3 ||Liverpool ||39,576
|-
|Premier League||30 November 2013 ||bgcolor="#CCFFCC"|4–0 ||Stoke City ||35,513
|-
|Premier League||14 December 2013 ||bgcolor="#CCFFCC"|4–1 ||Fulham ||33,796
|-
|Premier League||26 December 2013 ||bgcolor="#FFCCCC"|0–1 ||Sunderland ||39,193
|-
|Premier League||29 December 2013 ||bgcolor="#CCFFCC"|2–1 ||Southampton ||39,092
|-
|FA Cup||4 January 2014 ||bgcolor="#CCFFCC"|4–0 ||Queens Park Rangers ||32,283
|-
|Premier League||11 January 2014 ||bgcolor="#CCFFCC"|2–0 ||Norwich City ||36,827
|-
|Premier League||1 February 2014 ||bgcolor="#CCFFCC"|2–1 ||Aston Villa ||39,469
|-
|FA Cup||16 February 2014 ||bgcolor="#CCFFCC"|3–1 ||Swansea City ||31,498
|-
|Premier League||1 March 2014 ||bgcolor="#CCFFCC"|1–0 ||West Ham United ||38,286
|-
|Premier League||15 March 2014 ||bgcolor="#CCFFCC"|2–1 ||Cardiff City ||38,018
|-
|Premier League||22 March 2014 ||bgcolor="#CCFFCC"|3–2 ||Swansea City ||36,260
|-
|Premier League||6 April 2014 ||bgcolor="#CCFFCC"|3–0 ||Arsenal ||39,504
|-
|Premier League||16 April 2014 ||bgcolor="#FFCCCC"|2–3 ||Crystal Palace ||39,333
|-
|Premier League||20 April 2014 ||bgcolor="#CCFFCC"|2–0 ||Manchester United ||39,436
|-
|Premier League||3 May 2014 ||bgcolor="#FFCCCC"|2–3 ||Manchester City ||39,454
|-
|bgcolor="#C0C0C0"|
|bgcolor="#C0C0C0"|
|bgcolor="#C0C0C0"|
| Total attendance
|803,413
|-
|bgcolor="#C0C0C0"|
|bgcolor="#C0C0C0"|
|bgcolor="#C0C0C0"|
| Total league attendance
|716,902
|-
|bgcolor="#C0C0C0"|
|bgcolor="#C0C0C0"|
|bgcolor="#C0C0C0"|
| Average attendance
|36,519
|-
|bgcolor="#C0C0C0"|
|bgcolor="#C0C0C0"|
|bgcolor="#C0C0C0"|
| Average league attendance
|37,732

Transfers

In

Out

Loans in

Loans out

References

Everton F.C. seasons
Everton